The Fanny Edel Falk Laboratory School, or simply the Falk School, is a private kindergarten through eighth grade laboratory school of the University of Pittsburgh.  It is located on the University of Pittsburgh's upper campus on Allequippa St.

Charter
Falk Laboratory School was established in 1930 under a charter agreement between the University of Pittsburgh and benefactors Leon Falk Jr. and his sister, Marjorie Falk Levy. The school was named in honor of Leon and Marjorie's mother, Fanny Edel Falk. It features progressive, experiential, and inquiry-based instruction and develops and refines its own curriculum.

Originally chartered as a  progressive experimental school for demonstration purposes, Falk School's charter was amended in 1946 to include the mentoring and observation of practice teachers as one of the school's functions. It is the only known laboratory school in existence to have a legal charter that stipulates its purposes and functions. Over the years the faculty added to the school's original functions to incorporate educational research and to integrate new educational practices as they are developed.  Teachers are in charge of, and responsible for, developing their own curricula and programs.

History
Progressive laboratory child education at the University of Pittsburgh was established when a laboratory school for children four to seven years old was opened by the School of Education on October 6, 1913. The original school grew into two schools, collectively known as the University Demonstration Schools, composed of the School of Childhood, for children up to second grade, and the Elementary School for grades three, four, and five. Following a reorganization within the School of Education, the University Demonstration Schools became independent and continued as a private project known as the Community School until the establishment of the Falk School in 1931, at which time it reabsorbed the Community School.

The Falk School opened on September 14, 1931 with 78 enrolled children, a principal, seven full-time teachers, and a part-time teacher from the Department of Physical Education. The school at first was placed in temporary quarters in the Stephens house of the university until its own dedicated facility opened a few weeks later. Martin P. Chworowsky served as its original director. The Falk School facility had an original capacity for 155 children and included a nursery, kindergarten, and classrooms for first through sixth grades.  It originally admitted children from two and one-half to twelve years of age. A health program was directed by the Women's Medical Adviser of the University of Pittsburgh. The three lower grades had sessions between 9am and noon, while the upper grades met from 9am to 3:15pm.

By the end of Falk School's sixth year, it expanded to eight grades with full training for high school. Ongoing expansion and renovations allowed for a planned increase in enrollment from 275 students in 2008 to 429 in 2018.

Tuition for Falk School was originally $200 a year for lower grades and $275 a year for upper grades. Current tuition for  2018-2019 is $15,370 per year, for all grade levels K-8.

Building 

A Tudor-style gray stone school house with Old English slate shingle roof, the Falk School building was designed by Janssen and Cocken and built in 1931 at an original cost of $200,000. The cornerstone of Falk School was laid in August, 1931 and contains, among other papers, a speech read by Majorie Falk Levy in which she described the life and charter of her mother, and the school's namesake, Fanny Edel Falk. The building was designed to initially accommodate 155 students in its eight classrooms.

Expansion of the Falk School, from the  facility to a  facility occurred in 2008 and renovations of the original building were completed in 2009.  The $21.1 million expansion and renovations, designed by architectural firm Perkins Eastman, features several green building components and will allow for increased enrollment of up to 403 students by 2012. The new  academic wing for the school includes 14 classrooms for Kindergarten through eighth grade, a new computer classroom (now has been transformed into the WonderLab, A Hub For Learning Through Making), art room, library, cafeteria, science room, and support areas. The outdoor play area was relocated to the west side of the building and a new play area was constructed on the gym roof.

 The front facade of the new addition is designed to match the stone finish of the old building with a circular drive to enhance student safety during drop-off and pick-up. The back of the building has a more modern look with red siding and two walls of windows that enclose the expanded cafeteria and library space. The back also has two outdoor terraces and a sidewalk for easy access to the renovated ground-level play spaces.

Administration
The Head of School (Director) of Falk Laboratory School is a member of the Executive Committee in the University of Pittsburgh's School of Education and the Chair of the Falk School Board is the School of Education's Dean.  Falk School teachers are faculty in the University of Pittsburgh's School of Education and the Director holds the rank of Associate Professor at the University. Falk is a teacher-training site for education students at the University of Pittsburgh with as many as 30 Master of Arts in Teaching candidates apprenticing at Falk each year.

Notable alumni
Several graduates of Falk School have gone on to distinguish themselves or have been children of famous parents.
Monte Buchsbaum — world-renowned neuropsychiatrist and son of author and invertebrate biologist Ralph Buchsbaum
 Vicki Buchsbaum Pearse - marine biologist/author/editor and daughter of Ralph Buchsbaum 
David Greene — American journalist and one of the co-hosts of Morning Edition on National Public Radio
Patti Deutsch — comedic television actress and voice-over artist best known for her work on Rowan & Martin's Laugh-In and as a mainstay on the celebrity panel of the 1970s game show Match Game
Alec Karakatsanis - American civil rights lawyer, social justice advocate, recent recipient of the Stephen B. Bright Award by Gideon's Promise and the Trial Lawyer of the Year Award by Public Justice, co-founder of Equal Justice Under Law, and founder and Executive Director of Civil Rights Corps, a Washington D.C. impact litigation nonprofit
Lorin Maazel — world-renowned conductor, violinist and composer
Rob Marshall — Broadway choreographer and director of such movies as Into the Woods, Chicago, Memoirs of a Geisha, and  Mary Poppins Returns 
Ivan Abrams - American lawyer known for his rule-of-law work in southeastern Europe and Central Asia, as well as for work as a prosecutor and defense lawyer in the United States
Kathleen Marshall — Tony Award winning choreographer and Broadway director. Broadway credits include: Damn Yankees (director, 2017); In Transit (director and choreographer, 2016); Anything Goes (choreographer, 2011); The Pajama Game (director and choreographer, 2006), among others
John Rogers — son of Fred Rogers
Jonathan Salk and Peter Salk — children of Jonas Salk
 Wilver "Willie" Stargell Jr. and Kelli Stargell - children of Pittsburgh Pirates legend Willie Stargell
Fritz Weaver — Tony Award winning stage, screen and television actor
Owen Young — cellist, Boston Symphony Orchestra

References

External links
Falk Laboratory School web site
Falk School Green Roof on Pitt's virtual Campus Tour
University of Pittsburgh School of Education

Middle schools in Pittsburgh
Private elementary schools in Pennsylvania
Private middle schools in Pennsylvania
University-affiliated schools in the United States
1931 establishments in Pennsylvania
University of Pittsburgh